Posadnikovo is the name of several rural localities (settlements and villages) in Russia:
Posadnikovo, Leningrad Oblast[ru], a settlement of the crossing in Kusinskoye Settlement Municipal Formation of Kirishsky District of Leningrad Oblast
Posadnikovo, Novorzhevsky District, Pskov Oblast[ru], a village in Novorzhevsky District, Pskov Oblast
Posadnikovo, Opochetsky District, Pskov Oblast[ru], a village in Opochetsky District, Pskov Oblast
Posadnikovo, Vologda Oblast[ru], a village in Rostilovsky Selsoviet of Gryazovetsky District of Vologda Oblast